The Halmahera Sea is a regional sea located in the central eastern part of the Australasian Mediterranean Sea. It is centered at about 1°S and 129°E and is bordered by the Pacific Ocean to the north, Halmahera to the west, Waigeo and West Papua to the east, and the Seram Sea to the south.

Extent 
The International Hydrographic Organization (IHO) defines the Halmahera Sea as being one of the waters of the East Indian Archipelago. The IHO defines its limits as follows:

On the North A line from Wajaboela (Morotai) to Tg. Djodjefa, the Northern point of Halmahera.

On the East. A line from Tg. Gorango, the Northeastern point of Morotai Island, through Sajang and Kawé Islands to the Western extremes of Waigeo and Batanta Islands across to the Northwest point of Samawati Island, down the coast to Tg. Menonket its Southwest point, and thence to Tg. Sele, New Guinea.

On the South. The Northern limit of Ceram Sea between Obi Major and New Guinea [A line from ... Obi Major ... Tanjong Seranmaloleo its Eastern extreme, thence through Tobalai, Kekek, Pisang and Kofiau Islands to Tanjong Sele, the Western point of New Guinea].

On the West. The Southern limit of Molukka Sea  between Halmahera and Obi Major [A line from the Southern extreme of Halmahera to the North point of Bisa (Setile) Island, thence to the Northern extreme of Obi Major].

References

External links 
 Halmahera Sea entry on the Glossary of Physical Oceanography

Seas of Indonesia
Landforms of Halmahera
Landforms of North Maluku
Landforms of Papua (province)
Maluku Islands